Abhay Kumar Dubey is an Indian journalist and writer. 

Dubey is the author of  'Bharat Mein Rajniti-Kal Aur Aaj', 'World-famous Great Treasures'

List of Books 
Bharat Mein Rajniti-Kal Aur Aaj
World Famous Great Treasures
Rajneeti Ki Kitab
Rastvad Ka Ayodhya Kand
Bharat Ka Bhoomandalikaran
Unsolved Mysteries
Rahasya
Adventures

References

Living people
Indian political journalists
Writers from Delhi
Year of birth missing (living people)